6400 or variation, may refer to:

In general
 A.D. 6400, a year in the 7th millennium CE
 6400 BCE, a year in the 7th millennium BC
 6400, a number in the 6000 (number) range

Electronics and compouting
 Texas Instruments 6400 series ICs, a variant of the 7400-series integrated circuits
 IBM 6400 Accounting Machine
 IBM 6400, a family of printers
 CDC 6400. a mainframe computer
 Power Macintosh 6400 personal computer

Rail
 Bangladesh Railway Class 6400, a diesel locomotive train class
 GWR 6400 Class, a pannier tank steam locomotive train class
 NS Class 6400, a class of diesel-electric locomotive train

Other uses
 6400 Georgealexander, an asteroid in the Asteroid Belt, the 6400th asteroid registered; see List_of_minor_planets:_6001–7000
 6400 (District of Përmet), one of the postal codes in Albania

See also